Mexico has about two dozen glaciers, all of which are located on Pico de Orizaba (Citlaltépetl), Popocatépetl and Iztaccíhuatl, the three tallest mountains in the country.

Puebla / Mexico State
 Popocatépetl
Glaciar del Ventorrillo
Glaciar Norte (Popocatépetl)
Glaciar Noroccidental

 Iztaccíhuatl
Glaciar de la Cabeza
Glaciar del Cuello
Glaciar de Ayolotepito
Glacier Norte (Iztaccíhuatl)
Glaciar del Cráter
Glaciar Oestenoroeste
Glaciar Nororiental
Glaciar Centro Oriental
Glaciar de Ayoloco
Glaciar Sudoriental
Glaciar Atzintli
Glaciar de San Agustín

Veracruz
 Pico de Orizaba or Citlaltépetl
Gran Glaciar Norte, a small icecap with 7 outlet lobes including:
Lengua del Chichimeco
Glaciar de Jamapa 
Glaciar del Toro
Glaciar de la Barba
Glaciar Noroccidental
Glaciar Occidental 
Glaciar Suroccidental
and one disconnected niche glacier:
Glaciar Oriental

References

Mexico
Glaciers